Hunneberg is a Swedish mountain just east of Vänersborg and Trollhättan.

Mountains of Sweden
Landforms of Västra Götaland County
Vänersborg Municipality